Conferry (Consolidada de Ferrys C.A.) is a Venezuelan shipping company operating passenger and freight services to the islands of Margarita and Coche. Currently owned by Bolipuertos and the Venezuelan state, it serves the ports of Puerto la Cruz, Punta de Piedras, Guanta, La Guaira, Coche Island, and the international port of Guamache, The main office of Conferry is in Plaza Venezuela, in central Caracas.

Routes
Conferry operate routes across the Caribbean Sea.
 Punta de Piedras - Puerto la Cruz
 Punta de Piedras - Guanta
 Punta de Piedras - Coche Island
 Punta de Piedras - La Guaira

Fleet
Conferry operate a fleet of nine ships, consisting of six high speed ferries and four ferries/freight ships.

References

Transport companies of Venezuela
Transport companies established in 1970
Venezuelan companies established in 1970